The Cannone da 75/27 modello 06 was a field gun used by Italy during World War I and World War II. It was a license-built copy of the Krupp Kanone M 1906 gun. It had seats for two crewmen attached to the gunshield as was common practice for the period. Captured weapons were designated by the Wehrmacht during World War II as the 7.5 cm Feldkanone 237(i).

Variants 
Special fortress versions were produced as the Cannone da 75/27 modello 06 in Casmatta and Caverna. These had different carriages suitable for static use.

The Cannone da 75/27 A.V. was mounted on a high-angle pedestal mount for anti-aircraft use was produced and these were assigned to coastal defense and second line units during World War II.

In 1915 the anti-aircraft version formed the basis of Italy's first truck mounted artillery called the Autocannone da 75/27 CK.  Eventually twenty-seven batteries of five guns were formed during World War I.

Between the wars, many guns were modernized for tractor-towing with pressed-steel wheels and rubber rims. These weighed some  more than the original version with spoked wooden wheels.

The Cannone da 75/27 modello 12 was a modello 06 modified for greater elevation (-12° to +18° 30') and lighter weight (only ). Only small numbers were produced for the cavalry divisions of the Royal Italian Army. The Germans designated captured guns as the 7.5 cm Feldkanone 245(i).

Notes

References 
 Chamberlain, Peter & Gander, Terry. Light and Medium Field Artillery. New York: Arco, 1975
 Gander, Terry and Chamberlain, Peter. Weapons of the Third Reich: An Encyclopedic Survey of All Small Arms, Artillery and Special Weapons of the German Land Forces 1939-1945. New York: Doubleday, 1979

External links
 Cannone da 75/27 modello 06 on Landships
 75/27 modello 06 in Casamatta on JED

World War II field artillery
World War I artillery of Italy
World War I guns
World War II artillery of Italy
75 mm artillery